Clifton Dias (born 10 January 1991 in Goa, India) is an Indian footballer who currently plays for Salgaocar in the I-League.

Career

Salgaocar
Dias joined the Salgaocar youth team in 2010 and after one season in the youth under-19s he was promoted to the first team and came off the bench for Salgaocars 4-0 victory over East Bengal on 29 December 2011.

Career statistics

Club

References

Indian footballers
1991 births
Living people
I-League players
Salgaocar FC players
Footballers from Goa
India youth international footballers
Footballers at the 2014 Asian Games
Association football midfielders
Asian Games competitors for India